Sarah Klein (born 19 April 1985) is an Australian long-distance runner. She competed in the marathon event at the 2014 Commonwealth Games in Glasgow and the 2015 World Championships in Athletics in Beijing, China.

References

External links
 

1985 births
Living people
Australian female long-distance runners
Australian female marathon runners
World Athletics Championships athletes for Australia
Place of birth missing (living people)
20th-century Australian women
21st-century Australian women